Havenview is a rural residential locality in the local government area (LGA) of Burnie in the North-west and west LGA region of Tasmania. The 2016 census recorded a population of 715 for the state suburb of Havenview.

History 
Havenview was gazetted as a locality in 1966.

Geography
The Emu River forms much of the eastern boundary.

Road infrastructure 
Route C112 (Old Surrey Road) runs through from north-east to south-west.

References

Towns in Tasmania
Suburbs of Burnie, Tasmania